Roger Federer and Marat Safin were the defending champions but only Federer competed that year with Michel Kratochvil.

Federer and Kratochvil lost in the first round to Jim Thomas and Tom Vanhoudt.

Joshua Eagle and David Rikl won in the final 7–6(7–5), 6–4 against Massimo Bertolini and Cristian Brandi.

Seeds
Champion seeds are indicated in bold text while text in italics indicates the round in which those seeds were eliminated.

  Joshua Eagle /  David Rikl (champions)
  Petr Pála /  Pavel Vízner (semifinals)
  Petr Luxa /  Radek Štěpánek (first round)
  Tomáš Cibulec /  Leoš Friedl (semifinals)

Draw

External links
 2002 Allianz Suisse Open Gstaad Doubles Draw

Swiss Open (tennis)
2002 ATP Tour
2002 Allianz Suisse Open Gstaad